PAF Base Peshawar is an airbase of the Pakistan Air Force (PAF) located in Peshawar, Khyber Pakhtunkhwa, Pakistan. It is the operational site of the PAF's Northern Air Command, located to the east of Bacha Khan International Airport, which is shared by both civil aviation flights and military flights.

Notable incidents

 The airbase was the site of the 2012 Bacha Khan International Airport terrorist attack by the Tehrik-i-Taliban Pakistan (TTP), which left around nine people dead (including five TTP militants) and over 40 injured.
 One day after the Bacha Khan International Airport attack, on 16 December 2012, an additional six people, including five militants and one police officer died and two police officers were wounded in a gunfight that broke out near the airbase. Pakistani security forces claimed that the militants, who were Uzbeks, were accomplices of the TTP fighters who were killed on 15 December 2012 during the airport attack.

See also
 Pakistan Air Force
List of Pakistan Air Force Bases

References

Pakistan Air Force bases
Airports in Peshawar
Military installations in Khyber Pakhtunkhwa
World War II sites in India